Ricardo Nuno Oliveira da Rocha (born 18 November 1982) is a Portuguese former professional footballer who played as a central defender.

Club career
Born in Matosinhos, Rocha competed in the lower leagues until the age of almost 27, when he signed for G.D. Chaves for 2009–10. He made his debut in the Segunda Liga on 16 August by featuring the full 90 minutes in a 0–1 home loss against C.D. Feirense, and contributed a further 23 appearances as the season ended in relegation. Additionally, he helped his team reach the final of the Taça de Portugal, being sent off in the last minute of the 2–1 defeat to FC Porto.

Rocha left Chaves in late January 2011, and joined Primeira Liga club S.C. Beira-Mar on a free transfer. After failing to establish himself, he returned to the second tier with S.C. Covilhã in the summer.

In another January transfer window move, and again as a free agent, Rocha returned to Chaves in 2013. He started in all his appearances in his first year, helping the side return to division two as champions.

Honours
Chaves
Segunda Divisão: 2012–13
Taça de Portugal runner-up: 2009–10

References

External links

1982 births
Living people
Sportspeople from Matosinhos
Portuguese footballers
Association football defenders
Primeira Liga players
Liga Portugal 2 players
Segunda Divisão players
F.C. Pedras Rubras players
AC Vila Meã players
G.D. Chaves players
S.C. Beira-Mar players
S.C. Covilhã players
C.D. Tondela players
AD Oliveirense players
Sport Benfica e Castelo Branco players
S.C. Salgueiros players